Eduard Bürgmeister (1879 – unknown) was a Czechoslovakian sailor, who represented his country at the 1924 Summer Olympics in Meulan, France.

References

Sources
 
 

Czechoslovak male sailors (sport)
Sailors at the 1924 Summer Olympics – Monotype
Olympic sailors of the Czech Republic
Czech male sailors (sport)
1879 births
Year of death missing